Desaulniers is a Québécois surname. Notable people with the surname include:

Abraham Lesieur Desaulniers (1822–1883), politician in the Quebec, Canada
Alexis Lesieur Desaulniers (1837–1918), Quebec lawyer and political figure
Arthur Lesieur Desaulniers (1873–1954), merchant and political figure in Quebec
Brianne Sidonie Desaulniers or Brie Larson (born 1989), American actress and singer
Élise Desaulniers, author of several French-language books
François Lesieur Desaulniers (1785–1870), Quebec farmer and political figure
Francois Severe Lesieur Desaulniers (1850–1913), politician in the province of Quebec, Canada
Gerry Desaulniers (1928–1984), retired Canadian professional ice hockey forward
Louis Leon Lesieur Desaulniers (1823–1896), Quebec physician and political figure
Marcel Desaulniers (born 1945), American chef, cookbook author, director Emeritus of the Culinary Institute of America
Michael Desaulniers, former World No. 1 hardball squash player from Canada
Napoléon Désaulniers, local politician in Shawinigan, Quebec
Roland Désaulniers, local businessman and politician in Shawinigan, Quebec

See also
Desaulniers, Ontario
Saulnier (disambiguation)
Saulnières (disambiguation)